Western Canada Theatre is a professional theatre company located in Kamloops, British Columbia, Canada. It was founded in 1975 by Tom Kerr under the name Western Canada Youth Theatre.

It currently offers seven live performances throughout the season; five mainstage and two alternative/experimental productions.  The season runs from September to May each year.

The company manages and performs in two spaces: Sagebrush Theatre, a 706-seat proscenium theatre, and Pavilion Theatre, a 150-seat black box theatre space. Sagebrush Theatre is the company's mainstage performance space while Pavilion Theatre is the site of the smaller productions. Sagebrush Theatre is shared with the Kamloops School District.

The current artistic director is James MacDonald. Previous artistic directors include Tom Kerr, Frank Glassen, David Ross, Michael Dobbin, John Cooper, Jeremy Tow, and Daryl Cloran.

References

External links 
 

Theatres in British Columbia
Theatre companies in British Columbia
Kamloops